Jan Kan (18 May 1873 – 8 May 1947) was a Dutch writer. His work was part of the literature event in the art competition at the 1932 Summer Olympics.

References

1873 births
1947 deaths
20th-century Dutch male writers
Olympic competitors in art competitions
People from Nijmegen